This was the first edition of the tournament.

Quinn Gleason and Catherine Harrison won the title, defeating Hailey Baptiste and Whitney Osuigwe in the final, 7–5, 6–2.

Seeds

Draw

Draw

References
Main Draw

Kentucky Open - Doubles